Arcturian is the fifth studio album by the Norwegian avant-garde metal band Arcturus. It was released on May 8, 2015 and was the first album by the band in ten years. The album features Simen "ICS Vortex" Hestnæs as the principal vocalist. The first single for the album, "The Arcturian Sign", was released on March 27, 2015.

Track listing

Personnel

Arcturus 
 Simen Hestnæs (credited as "ICS Vortex") - vocals
 Knut Magne Valle (credited as "Møllarn") - electric guitar, lead vocals on "The Journey"
 Hugh Mingay (credited as "Skoll") - bass guitar
 Steinar Sverd Johnsen (credited as "Sverd") - keyboards
 Jan Axel Blomberg (credited as "Hellhammer") - drums, percussion

Additional personnel 
 Sebastian Grouchot - violin

Charts

References

Arcturus (band) albums
2015 albums